Bir Jdid (: "New Well") is a town on the Atlantic coast of Morocco, located between the cities of El Jadida and Casablanca in the region of Doukkala-Abda. It has a population of 15267, according to the 2014 census.

History

In 1919, the French built two dwellings in the heart of the village, which was called the "Saint Hubert", in relation to a well. The nearby inhabitants of the area used this name to distinguish this modern well from the rest of the old wells and added a new name to the original name of the place. Prior to the protection, the name of the Saint-Hubert was in 1920, where the town became a station between Casablanca and Azemmour, also known as the Fishermen's Forum, which became a resort and a resting place. The name of the new well was added to St. Hubert.

In 1921, a post office was built in the town. In 1926 a local school was established and in 1931 an internal boarding school was established to accommodate the students of the French school (Imam Al-Bukhari high school).

Historically, a secret prison was located in Bir Jdid. Among the people sent to this prison were the family of Mohamed Oufkir, who were subject to torture.

References

Populated places in El Jadida Province